Bostan (بوستان) is a town in the Balochistan province of Pakistan. It is located at 29°30'00N 67°52'0E with an altitude of 121 metres (400 feet).

References

Populated places in Balochistan, Pakistan